HMS Royal Sovereign was originally laid down as a 121-gun first-rate ship of the line of the Royal Navy. She would have mounted sixteen  cannon, 114  guns, and a  pivot gun. With the rise of steam and screw propulsion, she was ordered to be converted on the stocks to a 131-gun screw ship, with conversion beginning on 25 January 1855. She was finally launched directly into the ordinary on 25 April 1857.

Turret ship

After several years of inactivity, she was selected for conversion into an experimental turret ship instigated by Captain Cowper Coles, who believed that a mastless ship armed with turret-mounted guns was the best possible design for a coast-defence ship. The order to proceed with the conversion was issued on 4 April 1862.

The decks and hull sides were strengthened to carry the planned armament, and to absorb the force when the guns were fired. There was some delay when it was found that she had been cut down too far, necessitating some re-building of the sides. On the completion of her conversion on 20 August 1864, she was the first British turret-armed ship, and the only one with a wooden hull. Her length-to-beam ratio was slightly under 4:1, which was the smallest ever ratio used in British armoured ships.

Armament

The original design included five turrets, each containing either two 68-pounder smoothbore or one  smoothbore cannon. This was modified to a four-turret configuration, with one  twin turret, and three  single turrets. The initial guns carried were  smoothbores that fired a 150-pound spherical steel shot. In 1867 they were all replaced by  muzzle-loading rifles.

On 15 January 1866 three shots were fired at close range against the after turret of Royal Sovereign by one of the  guns carried by HMS Bellerophon to evaluate how well Coles' turrets held up to gunfire. While the armour plates of the turret were displaced, and one shot pierced the back of the turret, the ability of the turret to turn and the guns to fire was not impaired.

Service history

She was commissioned at Portsmouth for service in the English Channel, where she undertook limited operational service and was used for gun and turret testing and evaluation. She paid off in October 1866, being then re-commissioned in July 1867 for the Naval Review. She saw no further service until her sale in May 1885.

References

Bibliography

Oscar Parkes  British Battleships  
Conway  All the World's Fighting Ships  

David Lyon & Rif Winfield  The Sail & Steam Navy List 1815–1889  

Ships of the line of the Royal Navy
Battleships of the Royal Navy
Ships built in Portsmouth
1857 ships
Victorian-era battleships of the United Kingdom